Rocky Mountain was a provincial electoral district in Alberta, Canada, mandated to return a single member to the Legislative Assembly of Alberta from 1909 to 1935.

Rocky Mountain is not to be confused with Rocky Mountain House which was formed in 1940 north of Rocky Mountain's former boundary.

History

Members of the Legislative Assembly (MLAs)

In 1909 Rocky Mountain was formed from the western edge of Rosebud in the north part of the riding, the entire riding of Banff, the western half of High River and Macleod. As well as the north
part of Pincher Creek. In 1940, the north part of the riding merged with Cochrane to form Banff-Cochrane. Okotoks-High River expanded to fill the central portion of the riding and Pincher Creek expanded to fill the south end of the riding and became Pincher Creek-Crowsnest. The riding ran the length of the Rocky Mountains along the Alberta / British Columbia border.

After the Alberta Legislature passed an Act increasing the number of seats from 25 to 41, the Frank Paper described the Rocky Mountain constituency as a "monstrous gerrymander" which benefited labour interests. An effort was made for the 1909 election to have a single candidate represent both the Liberal and Conservative parties, but eventually both parties nominated a candidate. Henry Edward Lyon was nominated for the Conservatives, while John Angus McDonald was nominated for the Liberals.

Election results

1909 Alberta general election

1913 Alberta general election

1917 Alberta general election

1921 Alberta general election

1926 Alberta general election

1930 Alberta general election

1935 Alberta general election

See also
List of Alberta provincial electoral districts

References

Further reading

External links
Elections Alberta
The Legislative Assembly of Alberta

Former provincial electoral districts of Alberta